The Atengo River, also known as the Chapalagana River, is a river of Mexico. It is a tributary of the Huaynamota River in the southern Sierra Madre Occidental. Its basin is bounded on the east by the Sierra los Huicholes.

See also
List of rivers of Mexico

References

Atlas of Mexico, 1975 (http://www.lib.utexas.edu/maps/atlas_mexico/river_basins.jpg).
The Prentice Hall American World Atlas, 1984.
Rand McNally, The New International Atlas, 1993.

Rivers of Mexico
Río Grande de Santiago
Rivers of the Sierra Madre Occidental